Bakkafjörður is a small fishing village in North-East Iceland, located in a fjord with the same name.

The village has 72 inhabitants and is part of the regional service center of Langanesbyggð district in Northeastern Region.

History
Hróðgeir hvíti Hrappsson occupied Sandvík north of Digranes and Viðfjörður. He lived near Skeggjastaðir and Sandvík, which is now called Bakkafjörður but Sandvíkurheiði (between Bakkafjörður and Vopnafjörður), still bears the ancient name. Hróðgeir was born around 850 and came from Norway with his brother, Alrek Hrappsson, father of Ljótolf goða Alreksson.
 The first farm at Sandvík was most likely Höfn. Built in the 1800s somewhere near modern day Bakkafjördur. Later on, more houses were built on Hafnartangi. Most of these original houses were demolished except for one. 
 Halldórsshús was built in 1900. It was owned by Halldór, who ran his shop until his death in 1920. His trading house is still stands on the tang and is often referred to as the merchant's house or Halldórshús.

In Höfn, the port facilities were poor, despite the name, but boats lay by clapping at Hafnartangi and the catch was pulled (or carried up) ashore, directly to the house. In the early 1900s, around the trade and fish receptions that had then begun to form so-called grass farms on a pole in Hafnar's land with a small stock, a few cows and sheep, but most of those who lived on them also engaged to some extent in fishing. The main grass farms include Steinholt, Lindarbrekku, Bjarg and Bergholt. Some of these farms are still standing in some form and even inhabited in some houses, though not with animals.

After Halldór Runólfsson's death, Jakob Gunnlaugsson's Store in Copenhagen established a branch in Bakkafjörður, as Halldór had had a main business dealings with that company. Gunnlaugsson's shop in Copenhagen, took over Halldór Runólfsson's real estate in Bakkafjörður. In January 1936, Hannes Magnússon (manager of Gunnlaugsson's store), was shot by in the store. They did not know the causes, though there were some demands, but Professor Gissurarson later died of his wounds. After that, Gunnlaugsson's store was closed.

A telephone came between Vopnafjörður and Bakkafjörður in 1916. A rural telephone came in 1954 and electricity from a communal utility in 1972. In 1933 work began on the so-called Bakkafjörður road, a road around the countryside. In 1949, a road connection was finally established between Bakkafjörður and Þórshöfn over Brekknaheiði, after many years of work. Funds were first granted for the road in 1936, but construction did not begin in full until 1943. With the road, Langanesströnd and Bakkafjörður were connected to the country's road network for the first time. A road over Sandvíkurheiði between Bakkafjörður and Vopnafjörður was built in 1955-1960. Around 1945, the construction of a harbor on Bakkafjörður began, for the first time. Casting was done on top of the so-called rocks, which were cut just below the Hafnartang, and there a pier was created with a small wall. The pier was later lengthened. Around 1970. 
A small airport was built not far from the village. However, it did not come with a hangar, and funding for it from the public sector was repeatedly postponed. More often than not, the locals took matters into their own hands. In 1979, the municipality bought one of the so-called emergency fund houses; it was moved east and used as a hangar. This would have been unique, that a hangar was built without the involvement of the Civil Aviation Authority. This hangar was in use throughout the life of the airport.

Sights

Skeggjastaðakirkja is the oldest church in eastern Iceland can be visited at Skeggjastaðir, a farm on the main road close to Bakkafjörður. The wooden church which was built in 1845 seats about 100 persons, and it was renovated in its authentic style from 1961 to 1962 and reopened on 16 September 1962. The pulprit and the interior were made of driftwood. The altar painting dates from 1857. The small tower with three old bells were added in 1962. Legend has it that there has always been a church dedicated to Saint Thorlákur here since the Christianization of Iceland in 1000.
Permission to view the church must be obtained at Skeggjastaðir, however requests are rarely turned down.

Digranes lighthouse was built in 1943-1947 and is 18,4 m tall. From Digranes, the view over Bakkaflói is like no other.

References

External links
travelnet.is page on Bakkafjörður
Official village page (Icelandic)
https://www.langanesstrond.is/

Populated places in Northeastern Region (Iceland)